Diisononyl phthalate (DINP) is a phthalate used as a plasticizer. DINP is typically a mixture of chemical compounds consisting of various isononyl esters of phthalic acid, and is commonly used in a large variety of plastic items.

Health Issues

The European Union has set a maximum specific migration limit (SML) from food contact materials of 9 mg/kg food for the sum of diisononyl phthalates and diisodecyl phthalates.

DINP is listed as a substance "known to the State of California to cause cancer" under Proposition 65 legislation.

Studies find that exposure to environmentally relevant concentrations of DINP in zebrafish disrupt the endocannabinoid system (ECS) and affect reproduction in a gender specific manner, and have other adverse effects on aquatic organisms, as DINP upregulates orexigenic signals and causes hepatosteatosis together with deregulation of the peripheral ECS and lipid metabolism.

ECHA's Risk Assessment Committee (RAC) has concluded, on March 7, 2018, that Di-isononyl phthalate (DINP) does not warrant classification for reprotoxic effects under the EU's Classification, Labelling and Packaging (CLP) regulation

See also
 Diisoheptyl phthalate
Plastic pollution

References

Phthalate esters
Plasticizers